Squaw Sachem of Mistick (c. 1590-1650 or 1667) was a prominent leader of a Massachusett tribe who deeded large tracts of land in eastern Massachusetts to early colonial settlers.

Squaw Sachem was the widow of Nanepashemet, the Sachem of the Pawtucket Confederation of Indian tribes, who died in 1619. Her given name is unknown and she was known in official deeds as the "Squaw Sachem." Squaw Sachem ruled the Pawtucket Confederation lands aggressively and capably after Nanepashmet's death. Around 1635, along with several other Native Americans, she deeded land in Concord, Massachusetts to colonists, and by that time she had remarried to a tribal priest, Wompachowet (also known as Webcowit or Webcowet). In 1639 she deeded the land of what was then Cambridge and Watertown to the colonists, an area that covers much of what is now the Greater Boston area, including Newton, Arlington, Somerville, Malden, and Charlestown. She lived her last years on the west side of the Mystic Lakes near what is now Medford, Massachusetts, where she died sometime between 1650 and 1667. She is remembered on the Boston Women's Heritage Trail. Her sons, Wonohaquaham, Montowampate, and Wenepoykin were tribal leaders as well. She is sometimes confused with other contemporary Squaw Sachems in the region, including Awashonks and Weetamoo.

Controversy 
Using the Squaw Sachem of Mistick name or likeness has been protested by individuals of surrounding tribes as well as multiple social justice groups. There has been an ongoing battle (20+ years) to get rid of the use of the Sachem name and likeness as a mascot or logo in the surrounding towns. In 2020, the Sachem was removed as the mascot of the Winchester, Massachusetts public schools. Defenders of mascots often state their intention to honor Native Americans by referring to positive traits, such as fighting spirit and their being strong, brave, stoic, dedicated, and proud; opponents see these traits as being based upon stereotypes of Native Americans as savages.

References

1590s births
17th-century deaths
16th-century Native Americans
16th-century Native American women
17th-century Native Americans
17th-century Native American women
Native American leaders
Female Native American leaders
Massachusett people
Native American people from Massachusetts
Native American history of Massachusetts
People of colonial Massachusetts
Pre-statehood history of Massachusetts